Cochylimorpha africana is a species of moth of the family Tortricidae. It is found in Tanzania. The habitat consists of forests.

The wingspan is 12–16 mm. The ground colour of the forewings is white, with an ochreous tinge and grey suffusion in the basal area, along the costa and in the apical third. The hindwings are light grey, becoming darker towards the apex.

Etymology
The species is named after the continent where the material was collected, Africa.

References

Endemic fauna of Tanzania
A
Moths of Africa
Lepidoptera of Tanzania
Moths described in 2010